Nellie L. (foaled 1940 in Kentucky) was an American Thoroughbred racehorse bred and raced by Calumet Farm. She was sired by Blenheim and out of the mare Nellie Flag.

Trained by Ben Jones, in 1943 Nellie L. won the Kentucky Oaks and Acorn Stakes, two of the most important races for her age group.

References

1940 racehorse births
Racehorses bred in Kentucky
Racehorses trained in the United States
Kentucky Oaks winners
Thoroughbred family 9-f